Harald Totschnig (born 6 September 1974 in Kaltenbach, Austria) is an Austrian former cyclist. His brother Georg Totschnig was also a professional cyclist.

Major results
2003
 9th Overall Tour de Slovénie
2006
 3rd Road race, National Road Championships
2009
 5th Tour de Seoul
2010
 2nd Road race, National Road Championships
 5th Overall Flèche du Sud
 8th Overall Istrian Spring Trophy
 8th Poreč Trophy
 9th Raiffeisen Grand Prix
 10th Zagreb–Ljubljana
2011
 2nd Overall Flèche du Sud
 5th Trofeo Alcide Degasperi
 7th Overall Giro della Friuli Venezia Giulia
2013
 3rd Road race, National Road Championships

References

External links

1974 births
Living people
Austrian male cyclists
People from Schwaz District
Sportspeople from Tyrol (state)